Elvegård is a village in Narvik Municipality in Nordland county, Norway.  The village is located along the Skjomen fjord.  Skjomen Church is located in the village on the shore of the fjord.  There is a golf course in Elvegård, located along the river Elvegårdselva.

References

Narvik
Villages in Nordland
Populated places of Arctic Norway